Ericka Denise Lorenz (born February 18, 1981) is an American water polo player, who won the silver medal at the 2000 Summer Olympics. She also won a bronze medal at the 2004 Summer Olympics.

Lorenz was born in San Diego, California. Nicknamed "E", she attended Patrick Henry High School (San Diego, California) and was named first team All-American in water polo in 1997, '98 and '99. She was also two-time first team All-California Interscholastic Federation in volleyball and a four-time team offensive MVP in softball.

She attended UC Berkeley in the fall of 1999 and was selected to the US National Team, along with teammate Heather Petri. She was the youngest member (19) of the United States Olympic Team that competed in the 2000 Sydney Olympics. As a first year collegiate player in 2001, Lorenz led the California Golden Bears women's team in scoring with 44 goals and was named first team All-American. In the summer of 2001, she was the United States' leading scorer with 14 goals during the World Championships in Fukuoka, Japan. At the 2003 FINA Water Polo World Championship, Lorenz established herself as one of the world's most prominent outside shooters, helping the US team earn a gold medal with her 4 goals in the final game. Lorenz also won a gold medal at the 2001 World Junior Championships in Perth, Australia.

When not competing for Team USA, Lorenz is now a professional water polo player for an Italian team, Ortigia-Siracusa.

See also
 United States women's Olympic water polo team records and statistics
 List of Olympic medalists in water polo (women)
 List of world champions in women's water polo
 List of World Aquatics Championships medalists in water polo

References 
 UC Berkeley team bio
 US Water Polo profile, 5/26/06

External links
 

1981 births
American female water polo players
Living people
California Golden Bears women's water polo players
Medalists at the 2004 Summer Olympics
Medalists at the 2000 Summer Olympics
Olympic bronze medalists for the United States in water polo
Olympic silver medalists for the United States in water polo
Water polo players at the 2000 Summer Olympics
Water polo players at the 2004 Summer Olympics
World Aquatics Championships medalists in water polo
Sportspeople from San Diego